Unión Deportiva Orensana was a Spanish football team based in Ourense, in the autonomous community of Galicia. Founded in 1935 after a merger between Galicia SC Orense and Burgas FC, it was dissolved in 1952 and CD Ourense was founded in its place.

Season to season

3 seasons in Segunda División
6 seasons in Tercera División

References

External links
ArefePedia team profile 

Defunct football clubs in Galicia
 
Association football clubs established in 1942
Association football clubs disestablished in 1952
1942 establishments in Spain
1952 disestablishments in Spain
Sport in Ourense
Segunda División clubs